William Anderson Craven (June 30, 1921 – July 11, 1999) served in the California State Assembly for the 80th district from 1973 to 1974, 76th district from 1974 to 1978 and served in the California State Senate from 1978 to 1998. During World War II he served in the United States Marine Corps. In 1970, Craven was elected to the San Diego County Board of Supervisors.

References

1921 births
1999 deaths
San Diego County Board of Supervisors members
United States Marine Corps personnel of World War II
20th-century American politicians
Republican Party members of the California State Assembly
Republican Party California state senators